The Pointe du Van is a promontory that extends into the Atlantic from western Brittany, in France.

The local Breton name is Beg ar Vann. It is located in the commune of Plogoff, Finistère.

Headlands of Brittany
Landforms of Finistère